The 2021–22 Eastern Counties Football League, also known as the Thurlow Nunn League for sponsorship reasons, was the 79th season in the history of the Eastern Counties Football League, a football competition in England. Teams are divided into three divisions, the Premier Division at Step 5, and the geographically separated Division One North and Division One South (Eastern Senior League), both at Step 6 of the English football league system.

The allocations for Steps 5 and 6 this season were announced by the Football Association and published on the league's website on 18 May 2021, subject to appeals. The league constitution was published on 27 June.

After the abandonment of the 2019–20 and 2020–21 seasons due to the COVID-19 pandemic in England, numerous promotions were decided on a points per game basis over the previous two seasons.

Premier Division

The Premier Division featured 16 clubs which competed in the division last season, along with four new clubs, promoted from Division One North:
Fakenham Town
Lakenheath
March Town United
Mulbarton Wanderers

League table

Stadia and locations

Division One North

Division One North featured ten clubs which competed in the previous season, along with six new clubs.
Clubs, promoted from the Anglian Combination:
Harleston Town
University of East Anglia
Promoted from the Peterborough and District League:
Parson Drove
Peterborough North End Sports
Transferred from the United Counties League:
Huntingdon Town
Whittlesey Athletic

Also, Blackstones and Bourne Town were initially moved to this division from the United Counties League but they successfully appealed and their transfers were rescinded.

League table

Play-offs

Stadia and locations

Division One South (Eastern Senior League)

Division One South featured 14 clubs which competed in the division last season, along with six new clubs:
Clubs, transferred from Division One North:
AFC Sudbury reserves
Cornard United
Haverhill Borough
Ipswich Wanderers

Plus:
Buckhurst Hill, promoted from the Essex Olympian League
Park View, transferred from the Spartan South Midlands League

League table

Play-offs

Stadia and locations

References

Eastern Counties Football League seasons
9